The Education, Science and Culture Workers' Union was a trade union representing workers in education, research and entertainment in Yugoslavia.

The union was founded in 1978, when the Union of Workers in Education and Science merged with the Union of Workers in Culture, Arts, Radio and Television.  Like both its predecessors, it affiliated to the Confederation of Trade Unions of Yugoslavia.  By 1990, it had grown to 430,000 members and was led by Boris Lipužić.  That year, it split into various more localised unions, including the Independent Trade Union of Preschool Education Workers of Croatia, the Independent Trade Union of Croatian Primary Education Employees, the Independent Trade Union of Croatian Secondary Schools, the Independent Trade Union of Croatian Science and Higher Education and the Independent Trade Union of Croatian Cultural Employees.

References

Education trade unions
Trade unions established in 1978
Trade unions disestablished in 1990
Trade unions in Yugoslavia